Odayil Ninnu is a 1965 Indian Malayalam-language drama film directed by K. S. Sethumadhavan and written by P. Kesavadev based on his novel of the same name. The film deals with the life and struggles of a proud and hardworking rickshaw puller, Pappu. It stars Sathyan, Prem Nazir, K. R. Vijaya and Kaviyoor Ponnamma. Master Dasarath plays the young Pappu. Suresh Gopi made his acting debut with the film, who was then six years old. He appeared as the feudal lord's timid son, who also becomes the root cause for Pappu running away from home.

The film was a commercial success and also received critical acclaim for its raw energy and Sathyan's performance in the lead role. It received a certificate of merit at the National Film Awards. It was remade in Tamil as Babu (1971), in Telugu as Marapurani Manishi (1973) and in Hindi as Babu (1985).

Plot 

Pappu is a relentless fighter for justice and equality from early childhood. He organises protest against his teacher who discriminates between the landlord's son and other children. The landlord is provoked to wrath, and Pappu is obliged to leave home. From now on, he has to lead a hard, tough life, fighting at every step to uphold his ideals.

He takes odd jobs but had to give them up as he cannot stand the iniquity meted out by his employers. Ultimately, he settles down as a rickshaw-puller. One day he meets a child who fell into the gutter by accident. Pappu apologises and buys her some food.
He decides to take care of this child. Her name is Lakshmi.  That child became so arrogant and proud when she grew up. She did not even want Pappu's presence.

Pappu suffers ill health due to his hard work. The subsequent developments reveal him as an extremely affectionate human being, seeking pleasure in doing good to others and demanding nothing for himself. The film ends with the girl realising her mistakes.

Cast 
 Sathyan as Pappu, rickshaw puller as the protagonist 
 Prem Nazir as Gopinadhan / Gopi, rich and educated scholar
 K. R. Vijaya as young Lakshmi, Pappu taken her from gutter and raise to a graduate
 Kaviyoor Ponnamma as Kalyani, a widow and Lakshmi's Mother
 Adoor Bhasi as palisha vizhungi Velu mothalaly
 Adoor Pankajam as Saramma
 Adoor Bhavani as Mother of Pappu
 Manavalan Joseph as Mesthiri
 S. P. Pillai as Thomachan
 Thikkurissy Sukumaran Nair as chayakadakkaran Kurup
 Master Dasarath as Young Pappu
 Kutty Padmini as Young Lakshmi
 Kottayam Chellappan as Land Lord
 Suresh Gopi as Feudal lord's son
 Kalaikkal Kumaran
 Cheriya Udeswaram
 Kumari Vimala
 Muthukulam Raghavan Pilla
 C. O. Anto
 Gopinathan Pilla
 T.T Joseph
 Varghees Thittel
 Shobha

Soundtrack 
The music was composed by G. Devarajan with lyrics by Vayalar Ramavarma. There were seven songs by the famous Vayalar-Devarajan team in the film. Songs like ‘Ambalakulangare kulikkaan…'(P. Leela), ‘Kaattil ilamkaattil…' (P. Susheela), ‘Ammey ammey ammey nammude…' (Renuka), ‘Muttathe mullayil…' (S. Janaki), ‘ O! Rickshawala…' (Mehaboob), ‘Vandikkara vandikkara…' (K. J. Yesudas), ‘Maanathu deivamilla….' (A. M. Raja), were super-hits and still remembered. Guruvayur Dorai played mridangam in the song "Ambalakkulangare".

References

External links 
 
 Odayil Ninnu at the Malayalam Movie Database
 Suresh Gopi in Odayil Ninnu at the Old Malayalam Cinema Blog

1960s Malayalam-language films
Films based on Indian novels
Malayalam films remade in other languages
Films shot in Kollam
Indian drama films
Films directed by K. S. Sethumadhavan